Greatest Hits: God's Favorite Band is the second greatest hits album by American rock band Green Day, released on November 17, 2017.

Background
God's Favorite Band features 20 of Green Day's previous hits, as well as 2 new songs: a new version of the Revolution Radio track "Ordinary World", featuring country singer Miranda Lambert, and a previously unreleased song entitled "Back in the USA". The album includes songs from all of Green Day's studio albums, with the exception of 39/Smooth, ¡Dos!, and ¡Tré!. 10 of the tracks previously appeared on Green Day's 2001 greatest hits album International Superhits!. Although he had returned to his previous role as the band's touring guitarist, Jason White participated in the recording for "Back in the USA".

The album's title is a reference to a joke made by Stephen Colbert during the band's March 22, 2017 appearance on The Late Show, in which Colbert quipped that Green Day were "God's favorite band". Colbert's joke was in itself a reference to a comment made by Green Day drummer Tré Cool on the band's 2005 DVD Bullet in a Bible, in which Cool remarked that the rain clouds over the venue had cleared because "God wants to watch His favorite band again."

Track listing
All songs were produced by Green Day and Rob Cavallo except: "Know Your Enemy" and "21 Guns", which were produced by Green Day and Butch Vig; "2000 Light Years Away", which was produced by Green Day and Andy Ernst; and "Minority", "Warning", "Bang Bang", "Still Breathing", "Ordinary World", and "Back in the USA", which were produced by Green Day.

Personnel
Green Day
Billie Joe Armstrong – electric and acoustic guitars, lead vocals, harmonica, piano
Mike Dirnt – bass, backing vocals
Tré Cool – drums, percussion, backing vocals, accordion on "Minority"

Additional musicians
Petra Haden – violin on "Hitchin' a Ride" and "Good Riddance (Time of Your Life)"
Jason Freese – keyboards
Tom Kitt – string arrangement for "21 Guns"
David Campbell – string arrangement for "Good Riddance (Time of Your Life)"
Miranda Lambert - featured vocals on "Ordinary World"
Jason White – rhythm guitar on "Oh Love" and "Back in the USA"

Production
Green Day – production
Rob Cavallo – production
Butch Vig – production
Andy Ernst – production, engineering, mixing
Neill King – engineering
Kevin Army – engineering
Ken Allardyce – engineering
Doug McKean – engineering
Chris Dugan – engineering
Jerry Finn – mixing
Chris Lord-Alge – mixing
Jack Joseph Puig – mixing
Andrew Scheps – mixing
John Golden – mastering
Ted Jensen – mastering
Eric Boulanger – mastering

Charts

Weekly charts

Year-end charts

Certifications

References

2017 greatest hits albums
Albums produced by Rob Cavallo
Albums produced by Butch Vig
Green Day compilation albums
Reprise Records albums